Per-Olov "Ole" Brasar (born September 30, 1950) is a Swedish former professional ice hockey forward who played 348 games in the National Hockey League with the Minnesota North Stars and Vancouver Canucks, as well as several seasons for Leksands IF in the Swedish Division 1. He featured in the 1982 Stanley Cup Finals with the Canucks. Internationally Brasar represented Sweden at five World Championships and the 1976 Canada Cup.

Career statistics

Regular season and playoffs

International

External links 

1950 births
Living people
Leksands IF players
Minnesota North Stars players
People from Falun
Swedish ice hockey left wingers
Undrafted National Hockey League players
Vancouver Canucks players
Sportspeople from Dalarna County